Atlantic City algorithm is a probabilistic polynomial time algorithm that answers correctly at least 75% of the time (or, in some versions, some other value greater than 50%). The term "Atlantic City" was first introduced in 1982 by J. Finn in an unpublished manuscript entitled Comparison of probabilistic tests for primality.

Two other common classes of probabilistic algorithms are Monte Carlo algorithms and Las Vegas algorithms. Monte Carlo algorithms are always fast, but only probably correct. On the other hand, Las Vegas algorithms are always correct, but only probably fast. The Atlantic City algorithms, which are bounded probabilistic polynomial time algorithms are probably correct and probably fast.

See also 

 Monte Carlo Algorithm
 Las Vegas Algorithm

References

Randomized algorithms